The Roscow AL Davies Soccer Field is a sports venue located in Nassau, Bahamas. It is currently used mostly for soccer matches and is a part of the larger Baillou Hills Sporting Complex.

References

Football venues in the Bahamas
Sports venues completed in 2009